is a Japanese actor. He has appeared in more than 30 films since 2000. He is the son of former professional wrestler Seiji Sakaguchi and the brother of current professional wrestler Yukio.

Selected filmography

References

External links 

1975 births
Living people
Japanese male film actors